Summit University, Offa is a private owned University founded in 2015 and located in Offa. The University is owned and established by the Ansar-Ud-Deen Society of Nigeria, a Muslim organization established for the purpose of educational development of Muslims and Muslims society in Nigeria. The institution was established together with nine others private universities in Nigeria in 2015.

Academic Division 
The institution began operation fully in November, 2016 with 500 students and the courses available to be studied at the institution includes:

 Biology
 Chemistry
 Physics
 Mathematics
 Computer Science
 Arabic Studies
 Islamic Studies
 English and Literary studies
 Economics
 Business Studies
 Political Science
 Accounting

Vice Chancellor 
The founding vice-chancellor of Summit University, Offa is Professor Hussein Oloyede. The Vice-Chancellor has assured the public during the opening of the institution that the institution would be one of the cheapest private University in Nigeria. The Vice-Chancellor together with Vice Chancellors of other private universities had pleaded with the Federal Government to allow private universities also benefit from the TETFund (Tertiary Education Trust Fund) projects, so as to enable them survive and continue to provide quality education to everyone.

References 

Universities and colleges in Nigeria
Educational institutions established in 2015